Goddar is a river flowing in the Vellore district of the Indian state of Tamil Nadu.

References

See also 
List of rivers of Tamil Nadu

Rivers of Tamil Nadu
Rivers of India

ta:கொடாறு (ஆறு)